The La Crosse County School of Agriculture and Domestic Economy was a historic structure in Onalaska, Wisconsin.  It was designed by architects Parkinson & Dockendorff from La Crosse, Wisconsin.  It opened in 1909 as a school offering instruction in agriculture and domestic science.  The school closed in 1925.   The building has also been known as the Onalaska High School Annex.  It was listed on the National Register of Historic Places in 1987. The building was demolished in 1989.

References

School buildings on the National Register of Historic Places in Wisconsin
School buildings completed in 1909
Buildings and structures in La Crosse County, Wisconsin
National Register of Historic Places in La Crosse County, Wisconsin
1909 establishments in Wisconsin